Forces You Don't Understand is the fourth studio album by Australian noise rock band Lubricated Goat, released on 27 September 1994 by PCP Entertainment.

Track listing

Personnel
Adapted from the Forces You Don't Understand liner notes.

Lubricated Goat
Tony Lee – bass guitar
Vincent Signorelli – drums
Stu Spasm – lead vocals, guitar, bass guitar, sampler, synthesizer, tympani, production, recording (10)

Additional musicians and production
Tod Ashley – sampler, tape, recording (10)
Martin Bisi – production, engineering, recording
Jim Collaruso – trumpet
Jean Farrel Miles – design

Release history

References

External links 
 Forces You Don't Understand at Discogs (list of releases)

1994 albums
Lubricated Goat albums
Albums produced by Martin Bisi